Ellen Elizabeth "Elle" Smith (born June 19, 1998) is an American model, journalist, and beauty pageant titleholder who was crowned Miss USA 2021. As Miss USA, she represented the United States at Miss Universe 2021 where she was placed in the Top 10 semifinalists. Smith had previously been crowned Miss Kentucky USA 2021, and is the second woman from Kentucky to win Miss USA.

Early life and education
Smith was born in Springfield, Ohio, to parents Samuel Clayborne and Lydia Smith; she is biracial, being born to a black father and a white mother. Her black ancestors were enslaved on a plantation in Kentucky, before migrating to Ohio in the aftermath of the American Civil War. 

Smith graduated from Shawnee High School in 2016, where she was an honors student involved in choir, orchestra, volleyball, and drama. Afterwards, she moved to Lexington, Kentucky, to enroll in the University of Kentucky, graduating with a degree in broadcast journalism and a minor in political science in 2020. While a student, Smith served as vice president of the university's chapter of the National Association of Black Journalists. After completing her degree, Smith became an on-air reporter with WHAS-TV in Louisville, Kentucky, covering Southern Indiana within the Louisville metropolitan area.

Pageantry
Smith first became interested in competing in pageantry after one of her high school classmates, Brittany Reid, was crowned Miss Ohio Teen USA 2013. However, she ultimately did not sign up for a pageant until eight years later, with Miss Kentucky USA 2021 being her first ever pageant. She represented Germantown in the competition, and went on to win the title.

Miss USA 2021
As Miss Kentucky USA, Smith received the right to represent Kentucky at Miss USA 2021. Miss USA 2021 was ultimately held on November 29, 2021, in Tulsa, Oklahoma. In the competition, Smith advanced to the Top 16, and later the Top 8, before being announced as the competition's winner. Following her win, Smith became the second entrant from Kentucky to ever be crowned Miss USA, after Tara Conner was crowned Miss USA 2006. Smith was also the first titleholder under the new Miss USA Organization.

In the final question portion of Miss USA, Smith picked judge Ty Hunter, who asked "Sustainability is becoming more and more important in professional landscapes. How can we encourage business to be more environmentally conscious?," to which she responded:

As Miss USA, Smith represented the United States at Miss Universe 2021, where she placed in the top ten. In addition to the opportunity to compete at Miss Universe, Smith moved to Los Angeles to participate in events for the year of her reign.

References

1998 births
African-American beauty pageant winners
African-American female models
African-American women journalists
American beauty pageant winners
American female models
American women television journalists
American television reporters and correspondents
Living people
Miss Universe 2021 contestants
Miss USA winners
People from Louisville, Kentucky
People from Springfield, Ohio
University of Kentucky alumni
Female models from Kentucky
Female models from Ohio
Journalists from Kentucky
Journalists from Ohio